Kabeli River is a river in Taplejung District, Nepal. The river is 58 km long and basin size is about 900 km2.

The 25 MW Kabeli B1 Hydropower Station draws water from the river.

References

Rivers of Koshi Province
Taplejung District